Zhang Yiyang (born 1991 in Xingping, Xianyang, Shaanxi), also known as Gui Zai is a Chinese singer and actor. Zhang's main songs include "I Only Care About People Who Care About Me", "Crying Man", "So Care About You", among others.

Career
In April 2012, Zhang was invited to participate in the reality show entertainment program Happy to Move and won third place.

On June 19, 2015, his first original album Crying Man was released.

In August 2016, Zhang appeared as a guest on The Modern Heroes.

In September 2016, Zhang participated in the Colding Stereo music event.

In October 2016, Zhang was invited to participate in Tangshan's 2017 Lei Feng Spring Festival Gala.

In December 2016, Zhang participated in the CCTV Charm China Tour program and sang "Will Anyone Tell You" in the live show.

In 2017, he participated in the Next Idol Wuhan Division.

In June 2018, he performed in the movie The Soul of the Dragon.

In September 2018, he performed in the online serie Spontaneous Combustion at the First Time.

References

External links

Living people
1991 births
Singers from Shaanxi
Mandarin-language singers
21st-century Chinese male singers